President Casino may refer to:

President Casinos
 President Casino Laclede's Landing
 President Casino Broadwater Resort